The Women's 20 kilometres walk at the 2010 Commonwealth Games as part of the athletics programme was held on Saturday 9 October 2010.

Records

Results

External links
2010 Commonwealth Games - Athletics

Women's 20 kilometres walk
2010
2010 in women's athletics